was a Japanese mystery novelist, known for creating the fictional detective Kosuke Kindaichi.

Early life
Yokomizo was born in the city of Kobe, Hyōgo Prefecture. He read detective stories as a boy and in 1921, while employed by the Daiichi Bank, published his first story in the popular magazine Shin Seinen ("New Youth"). He graduated from Osaka Pharmaceutical College (currently part of Osaka University) with a degree in pharmacy, and initially intended to take over his family's drug store. However, drawn by his interest in literature, and the encouragement of Edogawa Rampo, he went to Tokyo instead. There he was hired by the Hakubunkan publishing company in 1926. After serving as editor in chief of several magazines, he resigned in 1932 to devote himself full time to writing.

Literary career
Yokomizo was attracted to the literary genre of historical fiction, especially that of the historical detective novel. In July 1934, while resting in the mountains of Nagano to recuperate from tuberculosis, he completed his first novel Onibi, which was published in 1935, although parts were immediately censored by the authorities. Undeterred, Yokomizo followed on his early success with a second novel Ningyo Sashichi torimonocho (1938–1939). 

During World War II, he faced difficulties in getting his works published and was in severe financial difficulties. The lack of Streptomycin and other antibiotics also meant that his tuberculosis could not be properly treated, and he joked with friends that it was a race to see whether he would die of disease or of starvation.

Soon after the end of World War II, his works received wide recognition and he developed an enormous fan following. He published many works as serials in Kodansha's Weekly Shōnen Magazine, concentrating only on popular mystery novels based on the orthodox western detective story format, starting with Honjin Satsujin Jiken (The Honjin Murders) and Chōchō Satsujin Jinken (both in 1946). His works became the model for many other postwar Japanese mystery writers. He was also often called the "Japanese John Dickson Carr" after a writer whom he admired. Yokomizo is most well known for creating the private detective Kosuke Kindaichi. 

Many of his works have been made into movies. In particular,  received two film adaptations by Kon Ichikawa: The Inugami Family in 1976, and his 2006 remake The Inugamis. 

The scholar Mari Kotani called his 1939 story  "the first successful adaptation of Bram Stoker's Dracula" and "the archetype of Japanese vampire literature."

Yokomizo died of colon cancer in 1981. His grave is at the Shunjuen Cemetery in Kawasaki, Kanagawa.

In 2018 a literature professor found a previously missing piece of Yokomizo's wartime serial romance story "Yukiwariso," completing the manuscript for publication in book form.

Legacy
The Yokomizo Seishi Prize is a literary award established in 1980 by the Kadokawa Shoten publishing company and the Tokyo Broadcasting System in honor of Yokomizo. It is awarded annually to a previously unpublished novel-length mystery. In addition, the winning story is published by Kadokawa Shoten and dramatized as a television movie by TBS.

Selected works

Works in Japanese
; 
; 
; 
; 
; 
; 
; .
; 
; 
; 
; 
; 
; 
; 

English Translations
The Honjin Murders (本陣殺人事件 Honjin satsujin jiken) translated by Louise Heal Kawai. Pushkin Vertigo, 2019; 
The Inugami Curse (犬神家の一族 Inugamike no ichizoku) translated by Yumiko Yamazaki. Stone Bridge Press, 2007; . Later published by Pushkin Vertigo, 2020; 
The Village of Eight Graves (八つ墓村 Yatsuhakamura) translated by Bryan Karetnyk. Pushkin Vertigo, 2021; 
Gokumon Island (獄門島 Gokumontō) translated by Louise Heal Kawai. Pushkin Vertigo, 2022; 
The Devil's Flute Murders (悪魔が来りて笛を吹く Akuma ga kitarite fue o fuku) translated by Jim Rion. Pushkin Vertigo, 2023;

See also

Japanese literature
Japanese detective fiction
List of Japanese authors
Vampire Moth

References

External links
 
 The Museum of Seishi Yokomizo 
 Yokomizo Seishi Encyclopedia 
 

1902 births
1981 deaths
20th-century Japanese novelists
Japanese mystery writers
Japanese crime fiction writers
Japanese detective fiction writers
Japanese editors
Mystery Writers of Japan Award winners
Japanese pharmacists
People from Kobe
Deaths from cancer in Japan
Osaka University alumni